Luis Zuñiga (born 4 July 1939) is a Chilean boxer. He competed in the men's lightweight event at the 1964 Summer Olympics.

References

External links
 

1939 births
Living people
Chilean male boxers
Olympic boxers of Chile
Boxers at the 1964 Summer Olympics
Place of birth missing (living people)
Lightweight boxers
20th-century Chilean people
21st-century Chilean people